The Gospel Hummingbirds are an American gospel music group from Oakland, California.

The group was founded in the 1970s by the father of Joe A. Thomas, who now sings lead vocals and plays bass in the group. They released two albums on Blind Pig Records in the 1990s, one of which (Steppin' Out) was nominated for a Grammy Award for Best Traditional Soul Gospel album.

Members

Joe Thomas-(former member deceased)
Joe A. Thomas-(former member)
Roy Tyler-(former member deceased)
Josh Lowrey-(former member deceased)
Clarence Nichols-(former member deceased)
James Gibson, Jr.
Mark Smith, Sr.-(former member)
Timothy Bell-(former member)
Morris LeGrande
Gerald Dayce
Charles Holland
http://www.thegospelhummingbirds.com

Discography

Route 66 To Heaven (Evans Music, 1981)
Steppin' Out (Blind Pig Records, 1992)
Taking Flight (Blind Pig, 1995)
Live in Paradise (Gospel Hummingbirds Records 2003)
Life Songs (Gospel Hummingbirds Records 2006)
http://www.thegospelhummingbirds.com

References
http://www.thegospelhummingbirds.com
Sandra Brennan, [ The Gospel Hummingbirds] at Allmusic

American gospel musical groups
Musical groups from Oakland, California
Musical groups established in the 1970s
Blind Pig Records artists